Boura, Burkina Faso may refer to:

 Boura, Boulgou, a village in the Tenkodogo Department of Boulgou Province
 Boura Department, a department of Sissili Province in southern Burkina Faso

See also
 Boura (disambiguation)